Adenolisianthus is a plant genus in the gentian family (Gentianaceae), tribe Helieae. The name of the genus is derived from Greek roots meaning "gland-bearing and smooth flower". Only one species, Adenolisianthus arboreus, has been classified as part of this genus.

Habitat 
Adenolisianthus arboreus is found in the river basins of the Rio Negro and the Rio Vaupes. Its area of distribution covers northwestern Brazil and the southern parts of Venezuela and Colombia. Adenolisianthus' primary habitat is lowland, white-sand savanna.

References 

 Gentian Research Network

Gentianaceae
Monotypic Gentianales genera
Gentianaceae genera
Flora of Brazil
Flora of Colombia
Flora of Venezuela